Laufey is a supervillain appearing in American comic books published by Marvel Comics. The character is depicted usually as an enemy of the Asgardian king Odin, father of Thor. He is the King of the Frost Giants, the biological father of Thor's adopted brother and archenemy, Loki. Created by writer Stan Lee and artist Jack Kirby, he first appeared in Journey into Mystery #112 (Jan. 1965), and was based on the goddess of the same name who in Norse mythology was actually the mother of Loki.

Colm Feore portrayed the character in the Marvel Cinematic Universe film Thor (2011).

Publication history
Laufey was created by Stan Lee and Jack Kirby and first appeared in Journey into Mystery #112 (Jan. 1965).

Fictional character biography
In the early days of the universe, Laufey ruled Jotunheim, realm of the Frost Giants. When his son Loki was born a runt, an ashamed Laufey ordered the baby hidden.

Odin, the King of Asgard, marched his forces into Jotunheim. Welding the mystical hammer Mjolnir, Odin faced down Laufey and destroyed his war club, prompting the Frost Giant to brandish a sword. Laufey tried to use his knowledge of land, such as trying to stop Odin with a concealed fire pit. A sprawling battle between the two forces ensued. The battle ended when Odin used Mjolnir to crush Laufey's skull. Odin discovered Loki in the wreckage of the castle and decided to raise him as his own. 

It was later retconned that Loki had been a child, rather than a baby, when Laufey was killed. The day before the battle, Loki had attempted to inform his father of an opportunity to stealthily kill Odin. Laufey struck Loki for calling him a coward. The next day, after the fateful battle and Odin's claiming of Loki as a son, Laufey was left wounded, but alive. A version of Loki from the future, who had traveled back in time to alter events, proceeded to decapitate him, stating that Laufey would never strike him again. He also made Odin adopt him.

Laufey's skull plays an important role in the first three issues of the renewed Thor series. Laufey's revitalized men attempt to reclaim his remains from a Roxxon facility owned by Minotaur. Upon traveling to Jotunheim with Malekith the Accursed, Minotaur used the blood of the Light Elves that were killed as part of a spell to resurrect Laufey.

As part of the "All-New, All-Different Marvel" event, Laufey appears as a member of the Dark Council alongside Malekith the Accursed, Minotaur, Ulik, and some unnamed Fire Demons.

During the "War of the Realms" storyline, Laufey appears and is about to eat Frigga when Loki arrives and saves his adopted mother. Laufey berates Loki on his recent treachery in the past. He then picks him up and seemingly eats him. Odin later gets enraged when he finds out that Laufey ate Loki. Laufey is later seen at the ruins of the Statue of Liberty swatting fighter jets. Laufey is later attacked by the Fantastic Four and an army of Dwarves that are wearing copies of the War Machine armor. Iron Man, Punisher, She-Hulk, Spider-Man, and Wolverine are fighting Laufey's Frost Giants. As Captain Marvel, Black Panther, Sif, and Thing confront Laufey, he pulls out the Casket of Ancient Winters which he eats as it augments his powers. While protected by Hofund's magic, Daredevil fights with Laufey until Laufey eats Hofund when it is thrown at him. Noticing that the Earth-1610 Mjolnir is going to self-destruct, Jane Foster throws it into Laufey as a half-digested Loki cuts himself and the Casket of Ancient Winters using Hofund where his magic is holding his body together.

Powers, abilities, and equipment
Like all Frost Giants, Laufey is cryokinetic, as well as possessing supernatural strength and durability, with an additional weakness to extreme heat. As a Frost Giant, he cannot be harmed by cold temperatures, thus making him immune to hypothermia. He has been seen wielding many weapons, including a giant war club, sword, large axe, and the Casket of Ancient Winters.

In other media

Television
Laufey appears in the Hulk and the Agents of S.M.A.S.H. episode "Hulks on Ice", voiced by Enn Reitel. He leads the Frost Giants in a plot to take over the Nine Realms. Amidst the agents of S.M.A.S.H. and Thor attempts to stop them, Laufey also locates and arranges for Ymir to be freed to fulfill his plans. After the Red Hulk defeats Ymir however, Laufey retreats.

Laufey appears in the What If...? episode "What If... Thor Were an Only Child?", where Odin returns Loki to him instead of adopting him, resulting a truce between Asgardians and Frost Giants. Loki has taken a blue gigantic appearance and is best friends with Thor, who has become a party-loving prince who throws wild global parties.

Film

Laufey appears in the live-action Marvel Studios film Thor portrayed by Colm Feore. Like the film's version of the Frost Giants, this version stands between 8 and 10 ft., has blue skin, and has red eyes. As in the comics, he is Loki's father, though he is unaware of this. Years prior to the film, Odin had established a treaty between Asgard and Jotunheim. After a group of Frost Giants tried to get into Asgard in the present however, Thor led Loki, Sif, and the Warriors Three to confront Laufey for violating the treaty. This results in a fight until Odin stops them and recalls Thor, Sif, and the Warriors Three to Asgard. Loki later gives Laufey access to Asgard to kill Odin while he is in his Odinsleep. Before Laufey can do so however, Loki betrays and kills the former.

Video games
 Laufey appears as a playable character in Lego Marvel Super Heroes,voiced by John DiMaggio. In a bonus mission, Laufey collaborates with Malekith the Accursed to capture Heimdall, though Thor and Loki come to Heimdall's rescue.
 Laufey appears as a playable character in Lego Marvel's Avengers.
 Laufey appears in Marvel Future Revolution as the final boss of the Midgardia storyline.

Toys
 A figure of Laufey was released in the Marvel Minimates line, based on the Thor film.
 A figure of Laufey was released in Hasbro's 3.75" Thor: The Mighty Avenger movie tie-in line.

See also

References

Characters created by Jack Kirby
Characters created by Stan Lee
Comics characters introduced in 1965
Fictional characters with ice or cold abilities
Fictional characters with immortality
Fictional characters with superhuman durability or invulnerability
Fictional dictators
Fictional kings
Marvel Comics characters with superhuman strength
Marvel Comics film characters
Marvel Comics giants
Marvel Comics supervillains
Thor (Marvel Comics)